O Mang? is the third studio album of South African hip hop artist Hip Hop Pantsula, released under the CCP/EMI S.A. label on 1 September 2003 in South Africa.

Track listing
 O Mang? - 8:35
 He Banna - 5:12
 On My Own - 4:11
 Nkago (Interlude) - 1:53
 Vele - 5:25
 Steak - 4:36
 Danger - 6:10
 O Ja Swaka - 5:32
 Raise It Up - 4:39
 Maak'om - 5:04
 On My Own - 5:00
 Maxhoba - 4:29
 He Banna (Instrumental) - 5:13
 O Re Jela Bana (Interlude) - 2:28
 Supa Nova - 3:52
 Maak'om (Acappella) - 4:21

2003 albums
Hip Hop Pantsula albums